Brontë was a 2005 play by British playwright Polly Teale about the lives of the Brontë sisters, their brother Branwell and their father Patrick. It also featured characters from the sisters' novels such as Cathy and Heathcliff from Wuthering Heights (1847).

The play was staged at the West Yorkshire Playhouse, Leeds, in 2005  and again in 2011.
In 2010 there was a production of Brontë at the Watermill Theatre in Newbury, directed by Nancy Meckler.  In 2015-2016 there was a production of Brontë by the Promethean Theatre Ensemble in Chicago, directed by Jaclynn Jutting.

References

External links

2005 plays
Biographical plays about writers
Plays set in the United Kingdom
Plays set in the 19th century
Cultural depictions of writers
Cultural depictions of British women
Brontë family